Jonathan David Viener (born July 10, 1972) is an American actor, comedian, writer, and producer.

Early life
Viener was born in New York City, New York.

Career
He is a writer and producer on the television series Family Guy, where he also voices many miscellaneous characters.

He is also known as the voice of Norm the Robot on Phineas and Ferb.

Filmography

Actor/voice actor
2002: Gilda Radner: It's Always Something - Chevy Chase
2002: The Late Late Show with Craig Kilborn - Himself
2003: The Support Group - John
2004: The Man in the Black Suit - The Man in the Black Suit
2004: The Act - Comedian
2005–present: Family Guy - Miscellaneous characters
2005–2019: American Dad! - Miscellaneous characters
2005: The Late Late Show with Craig Ferguson - Weatherman Bob Fogg / Bob the Groom
2005: Arrested Development - Frank
2006: Lighten Up - Bo's Friend
2006: Entourage - Agent
2006: Law & Order - Harvey Wallace
2007: The Half Hour News Hour - Bill Johnson
2008: The Onion Movie - Peen Out Guy
2008: Miracle of Phil - Medical Technician
2008: Wainy Days - Morgan Freeman
2008–2015: Phineas and Ferb - Norm 
2008–2010: Seth MacFarlane's Cavalcade of Cartoon Comedy - Miscellaneous characters
2009–2013: The Cleveland Show - Miscellaneous Characters
2011: Bar Guys - Guy
2011: Phineas and Ferb the Movie: Across the 2nd Dimension - Norm / Normbots
2011: Allen Gregory - CEO
2011: 3 Weeks to Daytona - Rob
2012: Ted - Alix
2012: Modern Family - Matt Keneally ("Tableau Vivant")
2013: Dads - Josh
2014: Conan - I Got This Presenter
2014: Dumb and Dumber To - KEN Conference 
2015: Ted 2 - Police Dispatcher
2015: Be Cool, Scooby-Doo! - Chuck Mangum / Zaharia Warrior / Rick
2016: Bordertown - Steve Hernandez
2017: The Orville - Talk Show Moderator
2018-2020: Our Cartoon President - Mike Pence, God, Howard Schultz
2019: Milo Murphy's Law - Norm
2020: Duncanville - Miscellaneous Characters
2020: Phineas and Ferb the Movie: Candace Against the Universe - Norm

Writer
1999: Trackers
2003: The Support Group - Developer / Screenplay
2005–2011: Family Guy - 9 episodes
2006: Lighten Up - Short Film
2009: Family Guy Presents: Seth and Alex's Almost Live Comedy Show
2011: Bar Guys - Short Film
2011–2013: The Cleveland Show - 4 episodes
2013: 85th Academy Awards - Special Material
2013: Dads - 3 episodes
2020-2022: Duncanville - 8 episodes

Producer
2009–present: Family Guy - Producer (2009–2010), Supervising Producer (2010–present)
2011–2013: The Cleveland Show - Co-Executive Producer
2013: Dads - Co-Executive Producer
2020-present: Duncanville - Co-Executive Producer (2020), Executive Producer (2021)

References

External links

1972 births
21st-century American male actors
American male television actors
American male voice actors
Living people
Male actors from New York City